Housatonic may refer to:

Place names in the United States
Housatonic, Massachusetts, a census-designated place in the town of Great Barrington 
Housatonic River, a river in western Massachusetts and western Connecticut, and the source for other uses of the word
Housatonic Valley, the valley and watershed of the Housatonic River

Schools
Housatonic Community College, in  Bridgeport, Connecticut
Housatonic Valley Regional High School, Falls Village, Connecticut

Transport
Housatonic Railroad, a railroad that operated independently 1836–1892, as a subsidiary 1892–1970s, and a separate company started in 1983 in western Connecticut
 SS Georgia (1890), a German passenger liner seized by the United States during World War I, renamed Housatonic, and sunk by a German submarine
 USS Housatonic, three United States Navy vessels, including the first ship to be sunk by a submarine

Other uses
Housatonic, a dialect of the Unami language
Housatonic (aka Housatannuck), reference to the Stockbridge Indians
Housatonic, an American nuclear weapon test of the Operation Dominic I and II series